North Carolina Highway 116 (NC 116) is a primary state highway in the U.S. state of North Carolina.  The highway runs east–west but is signed south–north, connecting the town of Webster between two major highways in Jackson County.

Route description 
NC 116 is a two-lane mountain valley highway; it serves as a short-cut to Western Carolina University from Franklin and North Georgia.  Mildly curvy, it passes through the town of Webster, where it crosses the Tuckasegee River.

History
Established in 1930 as new primary routing from NC 285 (previously known as Franklin Road; today known as Mockingbird Lane) to NC 106 (renumbered in 1940 as NC 107).  In the mid-1950s, the highway was extended west to a new alignment of US 23/US 441.

Junction list

References

External links

NCRoads.com: N.C. 116

116
Transportation in Jackson County, North Carolina
1930 establishments in North Carolina